Biological augmentation is the addition of archaea or bacterial cultures required to speed up the rate of degradation of a contaminant. Organisms that originate from contaminated areas may already be able to break down waste, but perhaps inefficiently and slowly.

Bioaugmentation is a type of bioremediation in which it requires studying the indigenous varieties present in the location to determine if biostimulation is possible. After discovering the indigenous bacteria found in the location, if the indigenous bacteria can metabolize the contaminants, more of the indigenous bacterial cultures will be implemented into the location to boost the degradation of the contaminants. Bioaugmentation is the introduction of more archaea or bacterial cultures to enhance the contaminant degradation whereas biostimulation is the addition of nutritional supplements for the indigenous bacteria to promote the bacterial metabolism. If the indigenous variety do not have the metabolic capability to perform the remediation process, exogenous varieties with such sophisticated pathways are introduced. The utilization of bioaugmentation provides advancement in the fields of microbial ecology and biology, immobilization, and bioreactor design.

Bioaugmentation is commonly used in municipal wastewater treatment to restart activated sludge bioreactors. Most cultures available contain microbial cultures, already containing all necessary microorganisms (B. licheniformis, B. thuringiensis, P. polymyxa, B. stearothermophilus, Penicillium sp., Aspergillus sp., Flavobacterium, Arthrobacter, Pseudomonas, Streptomyces, Saccharomyces, etc.). Activated sludge systems are generally based on microorganisms like bacteria, protozoa, nematodes, rotifers, and fungi, which are capable of degrading biodegradable organic matter. There are many positive outcomes from the use of bioaugmentation, such as the improvement in efficiency and speed of the process of breaking down substances and the reduction of toxic particles in an area.

Applications

Soil remediation

Bioaugmentation is favorable in contaminated soils that have undergone bioremediation, but still pose an environmental risk. This is because microorganisms that were originally in the environment did not accomplish their task during bioremediation when it came to breaking down chemicals in the contaminated soil. The failure of original bacteria can be caused by environmental stresses, as well as changes in the microbial population due to mutation rates. When microorganisms are added, they are potentially more suited to the nature of the new contaminant, meanwhile the older microorganisms are similar to the older pollution and contamination. However, this is merely one of many factors; site size is also a very important determinant. In order to see whether bioaugmentation should be implemented, the overall setting must be considered.  Also, some highly specialized microorganisms are not capable of adapting to certain site settings. Availability of certain microorganism types (as used for bioremediation) may also be a problem.  Although bioaugmentation may appear to be a perfect solution for contaminated soil, it can have drawbacks.  For example, the wrong type of bacteria can result in potentially clogged aquifers, or the remediation result may be incomplete or unsatisfactory.

Bioaugmentation of chlorinated solvents
At sites where soil and groundwater are contaminated with chlorinated ethenes, such as tetrachloroethylene and trichloroethylene, bioaugmentation can be used to ensure that the in situ microorganisms can completely degrade these contaminants to ethylene and chloride, which are non-toxic.  Bioaugmentation is typically only applicable to bioremediation of chlorinated ethenes, although there are emerging cultures with the potential to biodegrade other compounds including BTEX, chloroethanes, chloromethanes, and MTBE.  The first reported application of bioaugmentation for chlorinated ethenes was at Kelly Air Force Base, TX. Bioaugmentation is typically performed in conjunction with the addition of electron donor (biostimulation) to achieve geochemical conditions in groundwater that favor the growth of the dechlorinating microorganisms in the bioaugmentation culture.

Niche fitness
Including more microbes into an environment is beneficial to the speed of the cleanup duration. The interaction and competitions of two compounds influence the performance that a microorganism, original or new, could have. This can be tested by placing a soil that favors the new microbes into the area and then looking at the performance. The results will show if the new microorganism can perform well enough in that soil with other microorganisms. This helps to determine the correct amount of microbes and indigenous substances that are needed in order to optimize performance and create a co-metabolism.

Coke plant wastewater in China
An example of how bioaugmentation has improved an environment, is in the coke plant wastewater in China. Coal in China is used as a main energy source and the contaminated water contains harmful toxic contaminants like ammonia, thiocyanate, phenols and other organic compounds, such as mono- and polycyclic nitrogen-containing aromatics, oxygen and sulfur-containing heterocyclics and polynuclear aromatic hydrocarbons. Previous measures to treat this problem was an aerobic-anoxic-oxic system, solvent extractions, stream stripping, and biological treatment. Bioaugmentation has been reported to remove 3-chlorobenzoate, 4-methyl benzoate, toluene, phenol, and chlorinated solvents.

The anaerobic reactor was packed with semi-soft media, which were constructed by plastic ring and synthetic fiber string. The anoxic reactor is a completely mixed reactor while the oxic reactor is a hybrid bioreactor in which polyurethane foam carriers were added. Water from anoxic reactor, odic reactor and sedimentation tank were used and had mix-ins of different amount of old and developed microbes with .75 concentration and 28 degree Celsius. The rate of contaminant degradation depended on the amount of microbe concentration. In the enhanced microbial community indigenous microorganisms broke down the contaminants in the coke plant wastewater, such as pyridines, and phenolic compounds. When indigenous heterotrophic microorganisms were added, they converted many large molecular compounds into smaller and simpler compounds, which could be taken from more biodegradable organic compounds. This proves that bioaugmentation could be used as a tool for the removal of unwanted compounds that are not properly removed by conventional biological treatment system. When bioaugmentation is combined with A1–A2–O system for the treatment of coke plant wastewater it is very powerful.

Petroleum cleanup
In the petroleum industry, there is a large problem with how oilfield drilling pit is disposed of. Many used to simply place dirt over the pit, but it is far more productive and economically beneficial to use bioaugmentation. With the use of advanced microbes, drilling companies can actually treat the problem in the oilfield pit instead of transferring the waste around. Specifically, polycyclic aromatic hydrocarbons can be metabolized by some bacteria, which significantly reduces environmental damage from drilling activities. Given suitable environmental conditions, microbes are placed in the oilpit to break down hydrocarbons and alongside are other nutrients. Before treatment there was a total petroleum hydrocarbon (TPH) level of 44,880 ppm, which within just 47 days the TPH was lowered to a level of 10,000 ppm to 6,486 ppm.

Failures and potential solutions
There have been many instances where bioaugmentation had deficiencies in its process, including the use of the wrong organism. The implementation of bioaugmentation on the environment can pose problems of predation, nutritional competition between indigenous and inoculated bacteria, insufficient inoculations, and disturbing the ecological balance due to large inoculations. Each problem can be solved using different techniques to limit the possibilities of these problems occurring. Predation can be prevented by high initial doses of the inoculated bacteria or heat treatment prior to inoculation whereas nutritional competition can be settled with biostimulation. Insufficient inoculations can be treated by repeated or continual inoculations and large inoculations are resolved with highly monitored dosages of the bacteria.

Examples include the introduced bacteria fail to enhance the degradation within the soil,  and the bioaugmentation trials fail on the laboratory scale, but succeed on the large scale.  Many of these problems occurred because the microbial ecology issues were not taken into consideration in order to map the performance of the bioaugmentation. It is crucial to consider the microbes' ability to withstand the conditions in the microbial community to be placed in. In many of the cases that have failed, only the microbes' ability to break down compounds was considered and less their fitness in existing communities and the resulting competitive stress. It is better to identify the existing communities before looking at the strains needed to break down pollutants.

See also
biotransformation
Syntrophomonas zehnderi
Dehalococcoidetes

References

Microbiology
Bioremediation